David Markham (3 April 1913 – 15 December 1983) was an English stage and film actor for over forty years.

Markham was born Peter Basil Harrison in Wick, Worcestershire and died in Hartfield, East Sussex.

In 1937 he married Olive Dehn (1914–2007), a BBC Radio dramatist. They had four daughters: Sonia, an illustrator; Kika (b. 1940), an actress, widow of actor Corin Redgrave; Petra (b. 1944), an actress; and Jehane, a poet and dramatist, widow of actor Roger Lloyd-Pack.

In World War II, he was imprisoned as a conscientious objector, before being allowed to do forestry work.

Markham appeared occasionally in cinema and often on television. He appeared in Carol Reed's film The Stars Look Down (1939) and in François Truffaut's films Two English Girls (1972), in which he plays a fortuneteller with his daughter Kika, and Day for Night (1973). He played the father of Robin Phillips in two films, Two Gentlemen Sharing (1969) and Tales From The Crypt (1972).

Markham portrayed Prime Minister H. H. Asquith in the 1981 BBC Wales drama The Life and Times of David Lloyd George, alongside his daughter Kika Markham, who played Lloyd George's secretary, lover and later second wife – Frances Stevenson.

Selected filmography

 Murder in the Family (1938) – Michael Osborne
 The Stars Look Down (1940) – Arthur Barras
 The Blakes Slept Here (1953) – Edward
 The Dawn Killer (1959) – Mr. Hawkes
 Last of the Long-haired Boys (1968) – Brindle
 Two Gentlemen Sharing (1969) – Mr. Pater – Roddy's Father
 Family Life (1971)
 Blood from the Mummy's Tomb (1971) – Doctor Burgess
 Two English Girls (1972) – Palmist
 Tales From The Crypt (1972) – Father – Edward Elliot (segment 3 "Poetic Justice")
 Z.P.G. (1972) – Dr. Herrick
 Day for Night (1973) – Doctor Michael Nelson
 La guerre du pétrole n'aura pas lieu (1975) – Thomson
 Feelings (1975) – Professor Roland
 The Three Hostages (1977) – Greenslade
 La petite fille en velours bleu (1978) – Consul
  Off to Philadelphia in the Morning (1978) – William Sterndale Bennett
 Meetings with Remarkable Men (1979) – Dean Borsh
 Tess (1979) – Reverend Clare
 Richard's Things (1980) – Mr Morris
 The Life and Times of David Lloyd George (1981) TV series – Herbert Henry Asquith
 Winston Churchill: The Wilderness Years (1981) (mini) TV series – Marlborough
 Gandhi (1982) – Older Englishman

References

External links
 
 

1913 births
1983 deaths
Male actors from Worcestershire
20th-century English male actors
English conscientious objectors
English male film actors
English male stage actors
English male television actors
People from Wychavon (district)
Campaign Against Psychiatric Abuse